The Englehart River is a river in Timiskaming District in northeastern Ontario, Canada. It is in the Saint Lawrence River drainage basin and is a right tributary of the Blanche River.

Course
The river begins at Fallduck Lakes in Terry Township. It flows southeast, passes under Ontario Highway 66, and reaches Long Lake. It exits the lake heading east, passes over one of two dams and under Ontario Highway 573 at the community of Charlton (in the municipality of Charlton and Dack), then heads under Ontario Highway 560. The river passes over a series of waterfalls and rapids (Sunday Creek Falls, Horseshoe Falls, Hell's Gate, High Falls, and Nuisance Rapids), turns north, flows under Ontario Highway 11 and the Ontario Northland Railway mainline at the town of Englehart, then reaches its mouth at the Blanche River at Marter Township. The Blanche River flows via the Ottawa River to the Saint Lawrence River.

Watershed

Natural history
Kap-Kig-Iwan Provincial Park is located on the river between the communities of Charlton and Englehart. Englehart River Fine Sand Plain and Waterway Provincial Park includes a contiguous portion of the river between Ontario Highway 66 and the northwestern third of Long Lake, as well as discontinuous sections on the southeastern portion of Long Lake.

Geology
The river's course through Englehart River Fine Sand Plain and Waterway Provincial Park is in the Cross Lake Fault, the northeast facing escarpment of which is the southwest boundary of the Lake Timiskaming Rift Valley.

Tributaries
Crocodile Creek (left)
St. Jean Baptiste Creek (right)
Sunday Creek (right)
Long Lake
Tamarac Creek (right)
Aidie Creek (left)
Driftwood Creek (right)
Teepee Creek (right)
Flavelle Creek (right)
Middleton Creek (right)
Burt Creek (left)
Kenaja Creek (right)
Rib Creek (left)

See also
List of rivers of Ontario

References

Other map sources:

Rivers of Timiskaming District